Saling Township is one of eight townships in Audrain County, Missouri, United States. As of the 2010 census, its population was 1,472.

History
Saling Township was organized in 1837, taking its name from Saling Creek.

Geography
It contains four cemeteries, Macedonia, Applemans Chapel, Pleasant Grove and Mount Pisgah.

Larrabee Lake is within this township. The streams of Big Creek and Boat Branch run through this township.

References

 USGS Geographic Names Information System (GNIS)

External links
 US-Counties.com
 City-Data.com

Townships in Audrain County, Missouri
Townships in Missouri